This is a list of the longest winning streaks in National Hockey League (NHL) history. The list includes streaks that started at the end of one season and carried over into the following season. There are two lists, streaks that consist entirely of regular-season games and streaks made up of playoff games only. The Pittsburgh Penguins hold the record for the longest winning streak in NHL history at 17 games, which was set in the 1992–93 season; that team won the Presidents' Trophy for having the league's best record of 56–21–7. The Penguins hold an NHL-record total of 14 straight playoff game wins, beginning in the 1992 and ending in the 1993 playoffs . Only regular season winning streaks lasting twelve or more games are included.

The Montreal Canadiens appear six times across both lists, with four streaks over 11 games in the postseason and two streaks over 12 games or more in the regular season. The Boston Bruins appear four times across both lists, with three of those streaks over 10 games occurring in the regular season.

The longest undefeated streak (ties included) in NHL history belonged to the 1979–80 Philadelphia Flyers, who went unbeaten for 35 consecutive games. They also owned the record for the most consecutive games with at least one point.

Beginning with the 2005–06 season, tie games were abolished in favor of a shootout.

Key

Winning streaks

Regular season
This list contains only the top streaks consisting entirely of regular-season games.

Postseason
This is a list of streaks recorded only in the playoffs.

Regular season and postseason
This is a list of streaks that included regular season and postseason games.

Undefeated streaks
This list includes teams who had the longest undefeated streaks in NHL history. The streaks include ties.

Regular season

Regular season and postseason

Point streaks
This list includes teams who have recorded the most consecutive games with at least one point in NHL history. NHL teams can earn two points with a win, and one point with either a tie (until 2004), overtime loss (since 1999), or shootout loss (since 2005).

See also
 List of NHL records (team)
 List of National Hockey League longest losing streaks

References

External links
NHL Records
Hockey Reference

 

National Hockey League statistical records